Belgium competed at the 2016 Summer Olympics in Rio de Janeiro, Brazil, from 5 to 21 August 2016. Since the nation's official debut in 1900, Belgian athletes had appeared in every edition of the Summer Olympic Games, with the exception of the 1904 Summer Olympics in St. Louis. The Belgian team consisted of 108 athletes, 70 men and 38 women, across nineteen sports.

Belgium returned home from Rio de Janeiro with six medals (two in each color), which matched its overall tally from the 1996 Summer Olympics in Atlanta. A third of the medal tally was distributed to the Belgian cyclists, including the first ever gold of the Games won by Greg Van Avermaet in the men's road race. These Games also marked a historic first for the Belgians on the podium in collective sports after nearly a century, bringing them home a silver medal in the men's field hockey tournament. Indeed, the Belgian men surpassed their female counterparts in the medal count for the first time since 1988.

Apart from Van Avermaet and the men's field hockey team, other medals were distributed to the following athletes on the Belgian roster: a gold to Nafissatou Thiam, who edged out the defending champion Jessica Ennis-Hill of Great Britain in the women's heptathlon; a silver to Pieter Timmers, who became the first Belgian swimmer to ascend the Olympic podium, since Frédérik Deburghgraeve captured the gold in Atlanta two decades earlier; and two bronzes to judoka and three-time Olympian Dirk Van Tichelt (men's lightweight) and track cyclist Jolien D'Hoore (women's omnium).

Medalists

| width=78% align=left valign=top |

|  style="text-align:left; width:22%; vertical-align:top;"|

Competitors
The Belgian Olympic and Interfederal Committee fielded a roster of 108 athletes, 70 men and 38 women, to compete across nineteen different sports at these Games; it was the nation's second-largest delegation sent to the Olympics, falling short of the record achieved in London 2012 (111) by a few athletes.  Roughly three quarters of the nation's full roster size were made up of males more than their female counterparts, due to the attendance of the men's field hockey squad and the proliferation of men in judo, swimming, and track and field making the cut.

For individual-based sports, Belgium made its Olympic debut in golf (new to the 2016 Games), as well as its return to fencing after 12 years and archery after 16 years. Additionally, the Belgian female gymnasts were selected to compete in the team all-around for the first time at these Games after nearly seven decades. Track and field accounted for the largest number of athletes on the Belgian team, with 26 entries, while there was a single competitor each in archery, sprint canoeing, fencing, rowing, shooting, and weightlifting.

The Belgian roster featured London 2012 bronze medalists Charline Van Snick (women's extra-lightweight judo) and sailing veteran Evi Van Acker (Laser Radial), taekwondo fighter and former Iranian refugee Raheleh Asemani (women's 57 kg), world-ranked tennis player David Goffin, rising heptathlon star Nafissatou Thiam, badminton siblings Yuhan and Lianne Tan, and the prominent Borlée track and field quartet of twins and three-time Olympians Kévin and Jonathan, their younger brother Dylan, and their lone sister and 2008 relay champion Olivia, who eventually served as the nation's flag bearer in the opening ceremony.

Fifteen-year-old gymnast Senna Deriks, who helped the Belgians secure one of available berths in the women's team all-around at the Games, was the country's youngest competitor, with equestrian eventing rider and four-time Olympian Joris Vanspringel rounding out the lineup as the oldest competitor (aged 53). Vanspringel's teammate Karin Donckers topped the list of most experienced athletes on the Belgian roster, by becoming the country's first female to participate in her record six Olympics.

| width=78% align=left valign=top |
The following is the list of number of competitors in the Games. Note that reserves in fencing, field hockey, football, and handball are not counted as athletes:

Archery

One Belgian archer has qualified for the men's individual recurve at the Olympics by virtue of a top five national finish at the 2016 Archery World Cup meet in Antalya, Turkey, signifying the nation's Olympic return to the sport for the first time since 2000.

Athletics

Belgian athletes have so far achieved qualifying standards in the following athletics events (up to a maximum of 3 athletes in each event):

Track & road events
Men

Women

Field events

Combined events – Men's decathlon

Combined events – Women's heptathlon

Badminton

Belgium has qualified two badminton players for each of the following events into the Olympic tournament. London 2012 siblings Yuhan and Lianne Tan were selected among the top 34 individual shuttlers each in the men's and women's singles based on the BWF World Rankings as of 5 May 2016.

Canoeing

Sprint
Belgium has received an unused host quota place in the men's K-1 1000 m to the Olympics, as the next highest-ranked eligible nation, not yet qualified, at the 2015 ICF Canoe Sprint World Championships.

Qualification Legend: FA = Qualify to final (medal); FB = Qualify to final B (non-medal)

Cycling

Road
Belgian riders qualified for the following quota places in the men's and women's Olympic road race by virtue of their top 15 final national ranking in the 2015 UCI World Tour (for men) and top 22 in the UCI World Ranking (for women). The women's road cycling team was named to the Olympic roster on June 9, 2016, with the men joining them on July 22.

Men

Women

Track
Following the completion of the 2016 UCI Track Cycling World Championships, Belgian riders have accumulated spots in both the men's and women's omnium, by virtue of their final individual UCI Olympic rankings in those events.

Omnium

Mountain biking
Belgian mountain bikers qualified for two men's and one women's quota place into the Olympic cross-country race, as a result of the nation's ninth-place finish for men and twelfth for women, respectively, in the UCI Olympic Ranking List of May 25, 2016. The mountain biking team was named to the Olympic roster on June 9, 2016.

BMX
Belgian riders qualified for one women's quota place in BMX at the Olympics, as a result of the nation's top three finish for women in the UCI BMX Individual Ranking List of May 31, 2016. BMX cyclist Elke Vanhoof was named to the Olympic roster on June 9, 2016.

Equestrian

Belgium has entered two jumping riders into the Olympic equestrian competition by virtue of their top four finish outside the group selection in the individual FEI Olympic Rankings. Two eventing riders and one dressage rider have been added to the squad by virtue of the following results in the individual FEI Olympic rankings: a top nine finish from the combined overall in eventing, and a top two finish from South Western Europe in dressage.

Belgian equestrian team was named on July 12, 2016.

Dressage

Eventing

Jumping

Fencing

Belgium has entered one fencer into the Olympic competition, signifying the nation's sporting comeback for the first time since 2004. Seppe van Holsbeke had claimed his Olympic spot in the men's sabre by finishing among the top four individuals at the European Zonal Qualifier in Prague, Czech Republic.

Field hockey

Summary

Men's tournament

Belgium men's field hockey team qualified for the Olympics by having achieved a top three finish at the second stop of the 2014–15 Men's FIH Hockey World League Semifinals. Only three nations qualified through this route, but India had already secured qualification as the continental champion after the team's success at the 2014 Asian Games, leaving the remaining teams to automatically receive the three quotas.

Team roster

Group play

Quarterfinal

Semifinal

Gold medal match

Golf 

Belgium has entered three golfers into the Olympic tournament. Nicolas Colsaerts (world no. 124), Thomas Pieters (world no. 66), and Chloe Leurquin (world no. 402) qualified directly among the top 60 eligible players for their respective individual events based on the IGF World Rankings as of 11 July 2016.

Gymnastics

Artistic
Belgium has fielded a full squad of six artistic gymnasts (one man and five women) into the Olympic competition. The women's squad had claimed one of the remaining four spots in the team all-around for the first time since 1948, while an additional Olympic berth had been awarded to the Belgian male gymnast, who participated in the apparatus and all-around events at the Olympic Test Event in Rio de Janeiro. Lone male gymnast Dennis Goossens, along with the women's squad, were named to the Belgian roster for the Games on July 14, 2016.

Men

Women
Team

Individual finals

Judo

Belgium has qualified a total of five judokas for each of the following weight classes at the Games. Jasper Lefevere, Toma Nikiforov, London 2012 Olympians Joachim Bottieau and bronze medalist Charline van Snick, and two-time Olympian Dirk van Tichelt were ranked among the top 22 eligible judokas for men and top 14 for women in the IJF World Ranking List of May 30, 2016.

Rowing

Belgium has qualified one boat in the men's single sculls for the Olympics by virtue of his top three finish at the 2016 European & Final Qualification Regatta in Lucerne, Switzerland.

Qualification Legend: FA=Final A (medal); FB=Final B (non-medal); FC=Final C (non-medal); FD=Final D (non-medal); FE=Final E (non-medal); FF=Final F (non-medal); SA/B=Semifinals A/B; SC/D=Semifinals C/D; SE/F=Semifinals E/F; QF=Quarterfinals; R=Repechage

Sailing

Belgian sailors have qualified one boat in each of the following classes through the 2014 ISAF Sailing World Championships, the individual fleet Worlds, and Oceanian qualifying regattas. They also picked up a spare Olympic berth freed by Africa as the next highest-ranked eligible crew in the 49er class based on the results at the 2015 World Championships. The sailing crew, highlighted by London 2012 bronze medalist Evi van Acker, was named to the Olympic roster on June 2, 2016.

M = Medal race; EL = Eliminated – did not advance into the medal race

Shooting

Belgium has qualified one shooter in the men's trap by securing an available Olympic berth at the 2015 World Shotgun Championships in Lonato, Italy, as long as he obtained a minimum qualifying score (MQS) by March 31, 2016. The berth was awarded to rookie Maxime Mottet, as one of the nominated athletes from the second batch being named to the Olympic team.

Qualification Legend: Q = Qualify for the next round; q = Qualify for the bronze medal (shotgun)

Swimming

Belgian swimmers have so far achieved qualifying standards in the following events (up to a maximum of 2 swimmers in each event at the Olympic Qualifying Time (OQT), and potentially 1 at the Olympic Selection Time (OST)):

Men

Women

Taekwondo

Belgium entered three athletes into the taekwondo competition at the Olympics. Si Mohamed Ketbi and Jaouad Achab qualified automatically for their respective weight classes by finishing in the top 6 WTF Olympic rankings. Initially a member of the Refugee Olympic Athletes, Iranian-born Raheleh Asemani acquired a dual citizenship to compete internationally for Belgium at the Olympics by virtue of a top two finish in the women's lightweight category (57 kg) at the European Qualification Tournament in Istanbul, Turkey.

Tennis

Belgium has entered three tennis players (one man and two women) into the Olympic tournament. David Goffin (world no. 11), Kirsten Flipkens (world no. 61), and Yanina Wickmayer (world no. 50) qualified directly among the top 56 eligible players for their respective singles events based on the ATP and WTA World Rankings as of June 6, 2016.

Triathlon

Belgium has qualified four triathletes for each of the following events at the Olympics. Jelle Geens, Marten van Riel, Claire Michel, and Katrien Verstuyft were ranked among the top 40 eligible triathletes each in the men's and women's event, respectively, based on the ITU Olympic Qualification List as of May 15, 2016.

Weightlifting

Belgium has received an unused quota place from IWF to send a male weightlifter to the Olympics, as a response to the complete ban of the Russian weightlifting team from the Games due to "multiple positive" cases of doping.

See also
Belgium at the 2016 Summer Paralympics

References

External links 

 

Olympics
2016
Nations at the 2016 Summer Olympics